"All Night Long" is the third single from rapper Common's 1997 album One Day It'll All Make Sense. It features vocals from Erykah Badu and production from The Roots, and contains re-sung elements from "Don't Stop the Music" by Yarbrough and Peoples. The Brand New Heavies remixed it for the single's b-side and The 24 Hour Woman soundtrack.

Track listing

A-side
 "All Night Long (Dirty Version)" (4:30)
 "All Night Long (Album Version)" (7:35)

B-side
 "Feel the Vibes (All Night Long) (Brand New Heavies Remix)" (5:40)
 "Feel the Vibes (All Night Long Instrumental Version) (Brand New Heavies Remix)" (5:33)

See also
List of Common songs

Common (rapper) songs
1998 singles
1997 songs
Songs written by Erykah Badu
Songs written by James Poyser
Songs written by Common (rapper)
Relativity Records singles